Seungjeongwon ilgi or Journal of the Royal Secretariat is a daily record of Seungjeongwon, Royal Secretariat during the Joseon Dynasty of Korea (1392–1910), which records the king's public life and his interactions with the bureaucracy on a daily basis. It is the 303rd national treasure of Korea and was designated as part of UNESCO's Memory of the World Programme. UNESCO confirmed  as the world's longest continuous record of a king's daily life in 2001 and designated it in the Memory of the World Programme alongside Jikji. The record was written in Classical Chinese.

It is the subject of the Korean TV series Rookie Historian Goo Hae-ryung.

See also 
Annals of the Joseon Dynasty
Uigwe
History of Korea
Joseon Dynasty politics

References

External links

Official Site (in Korean) (South Korean government)

Joseon dynasty works
History books about Korea
Memory of the World Register
Chinese-language literature of Korea